Barbara Caine  is an Australian feminist historian.

Biography
She was born in Johannesburg, South Africa, then her family settled in Australia in 1960. Since 2015 she has been the Head of the School of Philosophical and Historical Inquiry at the University of Sydney. She has written extensively on British and Australian women's history, and has written biographies of a number of historical figures, including the Strachey family and the Webb family.

Caine researches and writes in the fields of nineteenth-century studies, women's history and biography and life-writing.  She is an elected Fellow of the Australian Academy of the Humanities, the Academy of the Social Sciences in Australia, and the British Royal Historical Society.

Caine established the first Women's Studies Centre in Australia at the University of Sydney, and oversaw its development into a Department of Women's Studies.

Awards and honours
In 2014, Caine became a member of the Order of Australia "for significant service to tertiary education, particularly gender studies, and as a role model and mentor".

Bibliography

Books 

 Victorian Feminists, 1992, Oxford University Press
 Destined to be wives: the sisters of Beatrice Webb, 1996, Clarendon Press
 English Feminism 1780-1980, 1997, Oxford University Press
 Gendering European History: 1780-1920 (with Glenda Sluga), 2000, Leicester University Press
 Bombay to Bloomsbury: a Biography of the Strachey family, 2005, Oxford University Press
 Biography and History, 2010, Palgrave Macmillan UK

Edited Books 

Crossing Boundaries: Feminism and the Critique of Knowledges (with Marie de Lepervanche), 1988, Allen and Unwin
Transitions: new Australian feminisms (with Rosemary Pringle), 1995, Allen and Unwin
Australian Feminism: a Companion (with Moira Gatens, Emma Grahame, Jan Larbalestier, Sophie Watson, Elizabeth Webby), 1999, Oxford University Press
Companion to Women's Historical Writing (with Mary Spongberg and Ann Curthoys), 2005, Palgrave Macmillan
Friendship: A History, 2009, Equinox Publishing Ltd

References

External links 
Barbara Caine at Sydney University
BBC interview on five hundred years of friendship <http://www.bbc.co.uk/programmes/b03zdbrl>
ABC interview on the relationship between biography and history<http://www.abc.net.au/radionational/programs/bookshow/biography-and-history/2930992>
Australian Academy of the Humanities <https://web.archive.org/web/20130411071612/http://humanities.org.au/Fellowship/FindFellows/tabid/123/articleType/ArticleView/articleId/1080/Caine-Barbara.aspx>
Academy of the Social Sciences in Australia <http://www.assa.edu.au/fellowship/fellow/513>British Royal Historical Society <https://web.archive.org/web/20140201213104/http://www.royalhistoricalsociety.org/rhsfellows-c.pdf>

Living people
1948 births
Australian historians
Australian women historians
University of Sydney alumni
Monash University alumni
Members of the Order of Australia
Fellows of the Academy of the Social Sciences in Australia
Fellows of the Royal Historical Society
Fellows of the Australian Academy of the Humanities